A New House is the seventh studio album by Scottish rock band Deacon Blue, released on 8 September 2014. The album consists of 11 tracks.

Track listing

Standard edition

Personnel

Ricky Ross — vocals
Lorraine McIntosh — vocals
James Prime — keyboards, backing vocals
Douglas Vipond — drums

Additional personnel

Gregor Philp — guitar
Lewis Gordon — bass

References

External links
 Announcement of 2014 Deacon Blue tour and new album

Deacon Blue albums
2014 albums